Gordon William Hunter (born June 4, 1928) is a retired American shortstop, coach and manager in Major League Baseball.

Playing career
He threw and batted right-handed. After attending Indiana University of Pennsylvania and Penn State, Hunter was signed by the Brooklyn Dodgers in 1948. He was sold to the St. Louis Browns of the American League (AL) on October 14, 1952, for $150,000 after leading the Texas League in fielding and stolen bases. 

Hunter was the starting shortstop for the last Browns club in 1953 and the first modern Baltimore Orioles team when the Brownies moved to Maryland in 1954. For the remainder of his career, however, he was a second-string infielder for the New York Yankees, Kansas City Athletics and Cleveland Indians. Hunter batted .219 with 16 home runs and 144 RBI in 630 games over his six-year (1953–58) AL career.

Scout and coach
When Hunter finished his playing career, he scouted for the Indians and Orioles. He managed the Bluefield Orioles to Appalachian League championships in 1962 and 1963. Hunter was promoted to Baltimore on November 20, 1963 as third-base coach by former Yankees teammate Hank Bauer, who had become the team's manager one day earlier. He performed that role for almost 14 seasons for four AL champions and two World Series winners. Hunter declined an offer from former Orioles general manager Harry Dalton to manage the California Angels on November 23, 1971.

MLB manager and college head coach
Hunter departed from the Orioles on June 27, 1977 to become the Texas Rangers' fourth manager that season, succeeding Connie Ryan, who had served in the interim for six games. His appointment ended the Rangers' bizarre search for a new manager, which had begun five day prior with Frank Lucchesi's dismissal, followed by Eddie Stanky's one-game stint. Despite the team trailing by  games in fifth place in the AL West, he stated upon his arrival, "I am accepting this job because I think the Texas Rangers have a contending team." Under Hunter, the Rangers won 60 of their final 93 games and climbed from fifth to second place. In 1978 the Rangers finished tied for second, five games behind the division-leading Kansas City Royals. During the season, Hunter had a confrontation with pitcher Dock Ellis on a team bus. Ellis was later quoted saying Hunter "may be Hitler, but he ain't making no lampshade out of me." After turning down a five-year contract extension in midseason, offered by Rangers'  young owner, Brad Corbett, Hunter was fired with one day left in the campaign due to his poor relationship with his team. When asked if he was sorry he took the manager's job, Hunter replied "yes."

Hunter's record over his one-and-a-half seasons was 146–108 (.575), but he never returned to the Major Leagues as a coach or manager, though he claimed to have received a half dozen job offers in the winter of 1978.  He became head baseball coach and athletic director at Maryland's Towson State University, retiring in 1995. He was a 1996 honoree into the Orioles Hall of Fame, inducted with Jerry Hoffberger and Cal Ripken, Sr.  These three men were so well thought of in Baltimore that a crowd of 400 showed up at the luncheon at the Sheraton Inner Harbor Hotel.

References

External links

1928 births
Living people
Baltimore Orioles coaches
Baltimore Orioles players
Baltimore Orioles scouts
Baseball players from Pennsylvania
Cleveland Indians players
Cleveland Indians scouts
Denver Bears players
Fort Worth Cats players
Kansas City Athletics players
Major League Baseball infielders
Major League Baseball third base coaches
Minor league baseball managers
Nashua Dodgers players
Newport News Dodgers players
New York Yankees players
People from Punxsutawney, Pennsylvania
Pueblo Dodgers players
St. Louis Browns players
San Diego Padres (minor league) players
Texas Rangers managers
Texas Rangers scouts
Towson Tigers athletic directors
Towson Tigers baseball coaches
Trois-Rivières Royals players